Naya Zamana is a 1971 Indian Hindi-language film produced and directed by Pramod Chakrovorty. The film stars Dharmendra, Hema Malini, Ashok Kumar, Mehmood, Pran, Lalita Pawar and Aruna Irani. The music is by S. D. Burman. It was written by Aghajani Kashmeri, who also wrote Love in Tokyo and Ziddi for Pramod Chakravorty. The movie is loosely based on the 1944 Bengali movie Udayer Pathey.

Cast
Dharmendra as Anoop
Hema Malini as Seema Choudhury
Ashok Kumar  as Sachin Choudhury
Mehmood as Mahesh
Aruna Irani as Rekha
Lalita Pawar as Anoop's mom
Pran as Rajendranath Choudhury / Rajan
Indrani Mukherjee as Asha
Manmohan as Ashok
Shabnam as Lilly
Jankidas as Sitaram
Dhumal as Dharamdas
Raj Mehra as IGP Anand Mohan
V. Gopal as Pandit
Baby Guddi as Guddi (as Guddi)

Plot
Anoop (Dharmendra) is a struggling writer. One day he meets with wealthy and beautiful Seema (Hema Malini) and both fall in love. When Seema's brother Rajan Choudhury (Pran) finds out, he is angered and forbids Seema to see Anoop again. On the other hand Anoop's sister, Rekha (Aruna Irani), and Rajan's brother-in-law Mahesh (Mehmood) have also fallen in love with each other. This angers Rajan even more and he turns Mahesh out of his house. Rajan finds out that Anoop has authored a book called "Naya Zamana", and decides to publish it and sell it under his name. Anoop and Seema find out when the book hits the stalls and is a big hit. Rajan is unapologetic. Rajan then tries to evict the poor people living in small tenements with Anoop and his mother (Lalita Pawar), but Anoop and Seema intervene, and as a result Rajan orders the tenements to be burnt secretly by his henchman Sitaram (Jankidas). Anoop is blamed for the destruction and arrested by the police. Seema's dad, Sachin Choudhury (Ashok Kumar) forbids Seema to see Anoop anymore as well as stay away from the poor people's lives. Seema will now to chose between her lover and her father.

Music
All lyrics were written by Anand Bakshi.
"Raamaa Raamaa Gajab Hui Gavaa Re" - Lata Mangeshkar
"Naya Zamana Aayega, Kitne Din Yu Dil Tarsenge" - Lata Mangeshkar
"Das Gayi Chuhi, Raina Kajrari Mai HaariKya Karu Jaanu Na, O Champa O Chameli" - Lata Mangeshkar
"Aaya Mai Laya Chalta Phirta Hotel, Garma Garma Garam Pakode" - Mehmood, Manna Dey
"Choro Ko Saare Nazar Aate Hai Chor" - Lata Mangeshkar
"Duniyaa O Duniyaa, Teraa Javaab Nahin" - Kishore Kumar
"Wah Re Naujawan Aajkal Ke, Rang Roop Apna Badal Ke" - Kishore Kumar

References

External links 
 

Films scored by S. D. Burman
1981 films
1980s Hindi-language films
Hindi remakes of Bengali films
Films directed by Pramod Chakravorty